The Colombian Professional Baseball League ( or LPB), is a professional baseball league based in Colombia. It is a four-team winter league that plays during the Major League Baseball offseason. The league's champion takes part in the Caribbean Series.

History
Colombian Professional Baseball League is commonly divided into three eras: from 1948 to 1958, from 1979 to 1988, and from 1993 to the present.

Early incarnations (1948–1988) 
Professional baseball in Colombia has its origins in 1948, when two foreign teams — the Havana Sugar Kings of the Florida State League, and Chesterfield of the Panamanian League — played an exhibition series against the Colombian national team. Shortly thereafter, business interests in Cartagena created the country's two first professional teams: Torices of Cartagena and Indios of Cartagena. Indios would go on to be the league's most successful club in its early years, winning seven championships.

Modern era (1993 – present) 
In 2004, the Colombian Professional Baseball League was provisionally accepted into the Caribbean Professional Baseball Confederation, but were not allowed to participate in the Caribbean Series until the level of play and the quality of baseball facilities improved. 

The league added two teams for the 2010–11 season, both in non-traditional baseball markets in the country's central regions: Potros, based in Medellín, and Águilas, based in the capital of Bogotá.  Additionally, the Toros moved from Sincelejo to Cali for economic reasons. These changes were reversed in the 2012–13 season, after Toros moved back to Sincelejo and the two expansion teams folded.

The league again added two new expansion teams for the 2019–2020 season: Gigantes de Barranquilla and Vaqueros de Montería. Vaqueros went on to become league champions in their inaugural season. They would also become the first team to represent Colombia in the Caribbean Series, after the LPB made its debut in the tournament's 2020 edition (replacing the Cuban National Series, which could appear due to visa issues).

After the outbreak of the COVID-19 pandemic, the LPB established a "bubble" format for the 2020–21 and 2021–22 seasons, with all games being played in Barranquilla. The pandemic also saw both Leones and Toros withdraw from the league. Gigantes were expected to fold after the 2021–22 season, but managed to return the next year.

In the 2022 Caribbean Series, Caimanes became the first LPB team to win the championship, defeating the Dominican Republic's Gigantes del Cibao. 

Despite this victory, controversy ensued when the Colombian league was again denied full membership into the Caribbean Professional Baseball Confederation.

For the 2022–23 season, the league announced it was considering adding an expansion team in Bolívar. This was confirmed in September, when it was announced that the expansion team would be placed in Cartagena. Getsemaní Leones de La Trinidad, founded in 1933 as an amateur team, had petitioned to join the league for over a year, but their entrance was delayed by COVID-19. However, before the start of the season, the league announced that both Getsemaní and Gigantes would not play due to financial difficulties; instead, Toros returned after a two-year absence, keeping the league at four teams.

Partnerships
The league is televised by Cultiva Entertainment. 
The league had an affiliation with the Yuma Scorpions of the Golden Baseball League for the 2009 season.

Ownership
The league is owned by the Renteria Foundation, a charity run by former Major League Baseball shortstop Édgar Rentería. In addition, players such as former Major League Baseball shortstop Orlando Cabrera have owned teams.

Format
The league has five teams around the country. The season is played from October to January. The top four teams at the end of the regular season, a first round robin phase of 50 games per team, advance to another round-robin (12 games for every team) with the two best teams contesting a best-of-seven final series to determine the league champion.

Teams and stadiums 
Four teams from the country's Caribbean region complete in the league.

Former teams 
 Gigantes de Barranquilla (2019–2022)
 Potros de Medellín (2010–2011)
 Águilas de Bogotá  (2010–2011)
 Leones de Cartagena (2003–2015) → Leones de Montería (2008–2015) → Leones de Santa Marta (2015–2020)
 Torices de Cartagena (1948–1988)
 Indios de Cartagena (1948–2002)

Colombian baseball stadiums

Champions

Championships by team

References

External links
Official website 

Latin American baseball leagues
Baseball competitions in Colombia
Winter baseball leagues
 
Baseball leagues in South America